Tess Jaray   (born 31 December 1937) is a British painter and printmaker. She taught at The Slade School of Fine Art, UCL from 1968 until 1999. Over the last twenty years Jaray has completed a succession of major public art projects. She was made an Honorary Fellow of RIBA (Royal Institute for British Architects) in 1995 and a Royal Academician in 2010. Tess Jaray is represented by Karsten Schubert, London.

Early life 
Born in Vienna in 1937, Jaray grew up in rural Worcestershire, England, where her parents emigrated in 1938 after the annexation of Austria by Nazi Germany made it unsafe for people of Jewish descent to live there. Jaray's father Franz Ferdinand Jaray was a chemical engineer and industrial inventor. Her mother, Pauline Arndt, attended Art School in Vienna. Jaray's great aunt was the gallerist Lea Bondi Jaray who was responsible for bringing many of the German Expressionists to London. Noting the influence of Gustav Klimt, leader of the Vienna Secessionists, Jaray has written that ‘He was one of the very first artists I learned about as a teenager.’

Travel, education and influence 
At the age of sixteen Jaray left home to study painting at Saint Martins School of Art in London. After completing her general education in fine art in 1957 Jaray was accepted to study at the Slade School of Fine Art. With a guaranteed place at the Slade she took time out to travel to Paris where she stayed at no.16 Rue des Cannettes in the hotel run by Marcel Proust's former housekeeper, Céleste Albaret. In Paris Jaray made several formative relationships including with fellow hotel guest Valli Myers and the Slovenian painter Zoran Mušič.
  
After five months Jaray returned to London to attend the Slade. At that time William Coldstream was Professor of Painting and the art historian E.H. Gombrich was in his last year as Professor of Art History. Both messianic figures influenced the young artist's thinking.
 
In the few years following art school Jaray was awarded two traveling scholarships. In 1960 she received the Abbey Minor Traveling Scholarship to Italy. Here Jaray experienced for the first time the impact of Italian Architecture, as well as the art she had gone there to see. The following year in 1961 she received the French Government Scholarship, which allowed her to return to France to live and work for some months. While in Paris she worked in the etching studio of Stanley William Hayter at Atelier 17.

Technique and teaching 
The impact of Renaissance architectural spaces Jaray encountered on her travels in Italy were formative for the development of her distinctive technique. In these ceilings she saw how simple lines interacted to transform space, powerfully inducing emotional responses. Writing on Jaray's paintings of the 60s Jasia Reichardt said they could be called '"ceiling geography" because they suggest views of an interior seen from below... Her paintings suggest some underlying mystery through the suggestion of architectural perspective.' Much of her career as a painter has been spent investigating the quality of effects geometry, pattern, repetition and colour have on space. The patterns she creates evoke spatial ambiguities and shifting structures which work on the viewer's perceptions in subtle ways. According to the critic Terry Pitts, her work ‘sense(s) the way in which history of decoration and patterning is embedded with elemental human experiences and impulses’.
At this time of significant development, in 1964 Jaray began teaching. For four years she taught at Hornsey College of Art, before becoming the first female teacher at the Slade in 1968. In 1999 Jaray became Reader Emeritus in Fine Art at the Slade.

Public commissions 

Between 1985 and 2000 Jaray devoted much of her time to working on public commissions, applying her understanding of architectural space and pattern to large-scale projects in public spaces. Her significant work of the eighties was a terrazzo pattern design for London Victoria train station. In the nineties she completed further large-scale public projects including paving, lamps and railings in Centenary Square, Birmingham (torn up in 2018); Wakefield Cathedral Precinct; Jubilee Square at Leeds General Infirmary; and the forecourt for the new British Embassy in Moscow.

Public collections 

 Abbot Hall Art Gallery, Kendal, UK
 Arts Council Collection, London, UK
 Contemporary Art Society, London, UK
 Graves Art Gallery, Sheffield, UK
 Museum of Contemporary Art, Belgrade, Serbia Museum des 20 Jahrhunderts, Vienna, Austria 
 Austria Städtisches Museum, Leverkusen, Germany Sundsvall Museum, Sundsvall, Sweden
 Museum of Fine Arts (Budapest), Budapest, Hungary
 British Council, London, UK
 British Museum, London, UK
 The Fogg Art Museum, Harvard University, MA, US
 The Sainsbury Centre, Norwich, UK
 The Tate, London, UK
 Victoria and Albert Museum, London, UK
 University College London, London, UK
 Walker Art Gallery, Liverpool, UK
 Western Australia Art Gallery, Perth, Australia Whitworth Art Gallery, Manchester, UK
 Worcester City Art Gallery & Museum, Worcester, UK

Writing 
Throughout her career Jaray has used writing as a way to reflect upon her work. However, from the mid-nineties Jaray started increasingly to write about other artists’ work. Several of these pieces have appeared as catalogue essays for exhibitions and on BBC Radio 3's The Essay. In 2001 Jaray collaborated with the German writer W.G. Sebald to realise an exhibition and book. FROM THE RINGS OF SATURN AND VERTIGO at Purdy Hicks Gallery, London presented sixteen pairings of Jaray's visual response to fragments from Sebald's novels The Rings of Saturn and Vertigo. Later that year twenty-three of the writer's micropoems were brought together with Jaray's paintings in For Years Now. It was published by Short Books in London shortly before Sebald's death in December that year. A selection of Jaray's essays and reflections on art and life were collected in Painting: Mysteries & Confessions published in 2010 by Lenz Books. In 1995 Jaray was made Honorary Fellow of the RIBA (Royal Institute for British Architects) for her contribution to urban design. In 2010 Jaray was elected Royal Academician. She lives and works in London.

Publications 
2003, Mel Gooding, Tess Jaray's New Paintings, catalogue essay for exhibition at Purdy Hicks Gallery, London.
2005 Kim Williams and Judith Flagg Moran, Urban Space and Pavements: The work of the Cosmati, Carlo Scarpa and Tess Jaray, Lettera Matematice 55. Also published in Mathematics and Culture, ed. Michele Emmer, publisher Springe.
2007, Oliver Bennett, Surface Tension, Landscape, 06/01/07.
2008, Tess Jaray, Jeongae Im, Art price no 6 vol 56
2009, Contemporary Crafts. English Case Study, Birmingham Imogen Racz, published by Berg Publishers.
2010, 'Painting: Mysteries and Confessions', Review, Times Literary Supplement, 02/05/10, Nancy Campbell.
2010, Brian Sewell, 10.06.10, Oh, no..., Evening Standard, London.
2010, Marius Granger: Tess Jaray, Catalogue Introduction for Layers, Seongnam Cultural Foundation, Korea.
2014, The Art of Tess Jaray. London, UK: Ridinghouse. 
2016, Desire Lines: The Public Art of Tess Jaray. London, UK: Ridinghouse.  
2010, Painting: Mysteries and Confessions. UK: Lenz Books.

References

External links
 
 
 Works by Tess Jaray at Karsten Schubert site

1937 births
Living people
20th-century British painters
21st-century British painters
Academics of the Slade School of Fine Art
Alumni of Saint Martin's School of Art
Alumni of the Slade School of Fine Art
Fellows of the Royal Institute of British Architects
Austrian emigrants to the United Kingdom
Royal Academicians
20th-century British printmakers